Ekaterina "Katja" Volkova (born 2 July 1997 in St. Petersburg) is a Finnish former individual rhythmic gymnast. She is also Russian citizen, and a daughter of Russian parents.

Career
Volkova started gymnastics in 2004. She is coached by Larisa Gryadunova and became a member of the Finnish national gymnastics team in 2012.

2013 
At the 2013 Finnish championships, she took the silver medal in the all-around behind Jouki Tikkanen and competed at the 2013 World Championships in Kyiv. Along with Tikkanen, she represented Finland at the 2013 European Championships, finishing 10th in the team standings. She appeared in her first FIG World Cup competitions in 2013.

2014 
Volkova was the 2014 Finnish national all-around silver medalist behind Tikkanen and appeared at the 2014 World Championships in Izmir.

2015 
Volkova won the all-around gold at the 2015 Finnish championships. She qualified in 27th place in the all-around at the 2015 World Championships and did not reach in the Top 24 finalists.

2016 
In 2016, Volkova competed at the Espoo World Cup where she finished a career high of 8th place in the all-around. On April 21–22, she beat compatriot Jouki Tikkanen for an Olympics license in individual rhythmic gymnastics by finishing fourth amongst a top 8 selection of highest score for non qualified gymnasts at the 2016 Gymnastics Olympic Test Event held in Rio de Janeiro.

Volkova finished 12th in the all-around at the 2016 Minsk World Cup. On June 17–19, she appeared in her first continental competition, the 2016 European Championships where she finished in 15th place. On July 8–10, she finished 16th in the all-around at the 2016 Kazan World Cup. On July 22–24, at the 2016 Baku World Cup, Volkova finished 8th in the all-around with a total of 71.000 points – a new personal best – and qualified to two apparatus finals.

On August 19–20, Volkova competed at the 2016 Summer Olympics held in Rio de Janeiro, Brazil. She finished 21st in the rhythmic gymnastics individual all-around qualifications and did not advance into the top 10 finals. She retired from gymnastics after Olympics to continue pursuing in her University studies.

References

External links
 
 

1997 births
Living people
Finnish rhythmic gymnasts
Olympic gymnasts of Finland
Gymnasts at the 2016 Summer Olympics
Finnish people of Russian descent